The May 2009 derecho series was an unusually strong sequence of derecho events and tornadoes beginning on May 2, 2009 and continuing through May 8, which primarily affected the Southern United States. At least seven people were killed by the storms. An associated tornado outbreak also resulted in nearly 100 tornadoes, some strong, with most strong tornadoes, most damage, and all of the deaths on May 8. In total, nine people were killed, dozens were injured and at least $70 million in damage occurred, $58 million on May 8.

May 3: Deep South derecho
On May 3, a moderate risk of severe weather was issued for parts of Mississippi, Alabama, and Georgia, mainly for a threat of intense downburst winds. A major progressive derecho with widespread and extensive wind damage - as strong as 110 mph (175 km/h) at times - and embedded tornadoes was confirmed to have traveled from East Texas all the way to Alabama with numerous reports of damage all across Louisiana, Mississippi and Alabama and into northern Georgia. At least one person was killed when a tree fell on her mobile home. A number of "large and extremely dangerous" tornadoes were reported in Alabama in the afternoon of May 3 by Storm Spotters and the NWS. Significant damage was reported near Moody, Pell City and Ragland in Blount and St. Clair Counties from this tornado according to ABC 33/40 coverage while tornadoes were reported in southern Jefferson County and northern Shelby County. Another reported tornado in Crossville, Tennessee resulted in significant damage and injuries.

May 8: Plains to Ohio Valley derecho

Another major severe weather event developed early on May 8 over southwestern Kansas. It quickly formed into a major progressive derecho which tracked across the central Plains, the Ozarks and into the Ohio Valley. Several tornadoes also developed, primarily in the Springfield, Missouri area where damage was reported. A moderate risk of severe weather was issued primarily due to the wind threat. That was preceded by two PDS severe thunderstorm watches (a rare issuance) issued early that morning, and a tornado watch later in the morning mentioning winds of  possible. Two people were killed near Poplar Bluff, Missouri when winds knocked a tree into their car. Another Missouri resident suffered a fatal heart attack after he was blown away from his home and thrown into a building. A woman was killed in southeastern Kansas after her mobile home was blown off its foundation. Eventually, the storm developed a tropical cyclone-like structure (a mesolow), with a well-defined eye feature. Another death occurred in Dallas County, Missouri from an EF2 tornado, as well as two others from an EF3 tornado in Kirksville, Kentucky. Dr. Joe Schaefer, director of the National Oceanic and Atmospheric Administration's Storm Prediction Center, commented that the "derecho complex is one of the worst I've seen in the past decade".

Other severe weather
On May 2, an EF1 tornado hit Eggville, Mississippi where damage was reported as a slow-moving front continued southward. In Valley Ranch, Texas, the practice facility for the Dallas Cowboys was destroyed by a microburst, injuring 12 people.

Tornadoes

May 2 event

May 3 event

May 4 event

May 5 event

May 6 event

May 7 event

May 8 event

See also
List of derecho events
Tornadoes of 2009

References

Tornadoes of 2009
Derechos in the United States
Tornadoes in Kentucky
Natural disasters in Kentucky
May 2009 events in the United States
2009 natural disasters in the United States